WLMF may refer to:

 WLMF-LD, a low-power television station (channel 20, virtual 53) licensed to serve Miami, Florida, United States
 WLGZ-FM, a radio station (101.9 FM) licensed to serve Bay Springs, Mississippi, United States, which held the call sign WLMF from 1991 to 1992